The Desulfococcaceae are a family in the order Desulfobacterales.

References

Desulfobacterales
Bacteria families